Lin Liangming (born 4 June 1997) is a Chinese footballer who currently plays for Chinese Super League side Dalian Professional.

Club career
Lin Liangming started his football career when he joined Guangzhou R&F's youth academy in 2010. On 22 July 2015, Lin transferred to La Liga side Real Madrid for a transfer fee of €200,000, signing a five-year contract with the club, becoming the first ever East Asian footballer to sign for Real Madrid. He was placed in Real Madrid Juvenil to play for the under-19 side during the 2015-16 season. In July 2016, Lin was promoted to the club's reserve team Real Madrid Castilla. He made his debut for the reserve team on 20 August 2016 in a 3–2 win against Real Sociedad B, assisting Sergio Díaz's winning goal in the 90th minute.

On 24 August 2017, Lin was loaned out to Segunda División side UD Almería for the 2017-18 season, being initially assigned to Almería B in the Tercera División. He made his debut for the first team on 5 September 2017 in a 1–0 loss against Cádiz in the 2017-18 Copa del Rey. On 29 July 2018, after helping the club gain promotion to Segunda División B, Lin's loan was extended for a further year. On 30 August 2019, Lin joined Portuguese Primeira Liga side C.S. Marítimo. He started playing for the club's U23 squad.

After negotiating with the Portuguese clubs C.S. Marítimo and Gondomar S.C. (who also owned part of his contract), Lin would return back to China to join top tier club Dalian Professional on 28 February 2020, initially on loan with the option to make it permanent. He would make his debut in a league game on 26 July 2020 against Shandong Luneng Taishan in a 3-2 defeat. This would be followed by his first goal for the club, which was in a league game on 29 August 2020 against Shandong Luneng Taishan where he scored the winner in a 1-0 victory.

International career
After impressing in Guangzhou R&F's youth academy, Lin was called up to the Chinese national under-17 team for the 2012 AFC U-16 Championship. He first played for the Chinese under-20 national team during 2016 AFC U-19 Championship qualification, making three appearances and scoring two goals.

Career statistics
.

References

External links

1997 births
Living people
Footballers from Shantou
Chinese footballers
Chinese expatriate footballers
Association football wingers
Segunda División B players
Tercera División players
Chinese Super League players
Real Madrid Castilla footballers
UD Almería B players
UD Almería players
C.S. Marítimo players
Dalian Professional F.C. players
Chinese expatriate sportspeople in Spain
Chinese expatriates in Portugal
Expatriate footballers in Spain
Expatriate footballers in Portugal